The 1970 Formula Ford National  Series was an Australian motor racing competition open to Formula Ford racing cars. It was the first annual Australian series for Formula Fords.

The series was won by Richard Knight driving an Elfin 600.

Series schedule

The series was contested over six rounds with one race per round.

Points system
Series points were awarded on a 9-6-4-3-2-1 basis for the first six places at each round.

Series standings

Notes & references

Formula Ford National Series
Australian Formula Ford Series